The Philadelphia Phillies are a Major League Baseball team based in Philadelphia, Pennsylvania. They  are a member of the Eastern Division of Major League Baseball's National League. The team has played officially under two names since beginning play in 1883: the current moniker, as well as the "Quakers", which was used in conjunction with "Phillies" during the team's early history. The team was also known unofficially as the "Blue Jays" during the World War II era. Since the franchise's inception,  players have made an appearance in a competitive game for the team, whether as an offensive player (batting and baserunning) or a defensive player (fielding, pitching, or both).

Of those  Phillies, 133 have had surnames beginning with the letter H. One of those players has been inducted into the Baseball Hall of Fame; center fielder Billy Hamilton played for the Phillies for six seasons (1890–1895), amassing three career franchise records and three single-season records. Hamilton's .361 batting average, .463 on-base percentage, and 508 stolen bases lead all Phillies in those categories, and his single-season records include most runs scored (192 in the 1894 season; also a major league record), most stolen bases (111 in the 1891 season), and highest on-base percentage (.523 in 1894). The Hall of Fame lists the Phillies as Hamilton's primary team, and he is a member of the Philadelphia Baseball Wall of Fame, as is Whiz Kid shortstop and second baseman Granny Hamner.

Among the 73 batters in this list, Lou Hardie has the highest batting average, at .375; he notched three hits in eight at-bats during the 1884 season. Other players with an average above .300 include Hamilton, George Harper (.323 in three seasons), Chicken Hawks (.322 in one season), Butch Henline (.304 in six seasons), Chuck Hiller (.302 in one season), Walter Holke (.301 in three seasons), Paul Hoover (.308 in two seasons), and Don Hurst (.303 in seven seasons). Ryan Howard leads all members of this list with 253 home runs and 748 runs batted in in his seven seasons with the Phillies.

Of this list's 62 pitchers, Bert Humphries has the best win–loss record, in terms of winning percentage;  his three wins and one loss notched him a .750 win ratio in his one season with the team. Cole Hamels' 74 victories and 1,091 strikeouts are the most by a player on this list, while Ken Heintzelman and Bill Hubbell lead with 55 defeats each. Tom Hilgendorf has the lowest earned run average (ERA) among pitchers, with a 2.14 mark; the only player to best Hilgendorf in that category on this list is Holke, a first baseman, who made one pitching appearance in 1979, throwing  inning and allowing no runs (a 0.00 ERA). Roy Halladay is one of the ten Phillies pitchers who have thrown a no-hitter, and the only man to accomplish the feat twice; in Halladay's first season with Philadelphia, he pitched a perfect game on May 29, 2010, and later became the second player to pitch a no-hitter in the postseason on October 6, 2010.

Two Phillies have made 30% or more of their Phillies appearances as both pitchers and position player. Bill Harman batted .071 in 14 plate appearances as a catcher while amassing a 4.85 ERA and striking out three as a pitcher. Hardie Henderson allowed 19 runs in his only game as a pitcher while notching a .250 average as a left fielder.

Footnotes
Key
 The National Baseball Hall of Fame and Museum determines which cap a player wears on their plaque, signifying "the team with which he made his most indelible mark". The Hall of Fame considers the player's wishes in making their decision, but the Hall makes the final decision as "it is important that the logo be emblematic of the historical accomplishments of that player’s career".
 Players are listed at a position if they appeared in 30% of their games or more during their Phillies career, as defined by Baseball-Reference. Additional positions may be shown on the Baseball-Reference website by following each player's citation.
 Franchise batting and pitching leaders are drawn from Baseball-Reference. A total of 1,500 plate appearances are needed to qualify for batting records, and 500 innings pitched or 50 decisions are required to qualify for pitching records.
 Statistics are correct as of the end of the 2010 Major League Baseball season.

List
 Mickey Harrington is listed with no position by Baseball-Reference; his only career appearance was as a pinch-runner for Roy Sievers.

References
General

Inline citations

H